Jakub Bartoň (born July 13, 1981) is a Czech former professional ice hockey defenceman. He played with HC Vítkovice in the Czech Extraliga during the 2010–11 Czech Extraliga season.

Career statistics

References

External links

1981 births
Living people
Basingstoke Bison players
Corsaires de Dunkerque players
Czech ice hockey defencemen
HC Havířov players
SK Horácká Slavia Třebíč players
HC Kometa Brno players
HC Oceláři Třinec players
HC Olomouc players
Orli Znojmo players
IHC Písek players
HC Slezan Opava players
Sportspeople from Jihlava
Stadion Hradec Králové players
Hokej Šumperk 2003 players
HC Vítkovice players
Czech expatriate ice hockey people
Czech expatriate sportspeople in France
Czech expatriate sportspeople in England
Expatriate ice hockey players in England
Expatriate ice hockey players in France